The Women's touch rugby tournament at the 2015 Pacific Games was held in Port Moresby from 3 to 7 July 2015 at the Bisini Touch Football Fields. The hosts Papua New Guinea won the gold medal defeating Samoa by 6–2 in the final. The Cook Islands took the bronze medal defeating Kiribati by 11–2 in the third place play-off.

Participants
Five teams played in the tournament:

Format
The teams played a round-robin followed by semifinals and play-offs for the medals.

Preliminary round

Day 1

Day 2

Day 3

Day 4

Finals

Semifinals

Bronze final

Gold final

See also
 Touch rugby at the Pacific Games
 Touch rugby at the 2015 Pacific Games – Men's tournament
 Touch rugby at the 2015 Pacific Games – Mixed tournament

References

Touch rugby at the 2015 Pacific Games